Ardshealach (Scottish Gaelic:) is a small hamlet located close to the south west shore of Loch Shiel in Sunart, Lochaber, Highland, less than  southeast of Acharacle. It is in the Scottish council area of the Highland, Scotland.

References

See also
Claish Moss

Populated places in Lochaber